Chatrine Britt Louise Pålsson Ahlgren (born June 22, 1947) is a Swedish Christian Democratic politician. She was a member of the Riksdag from 1991 to 2009.

External links
Chatrine Pålsson Ahlgren at the Riksdag website

1947 births
21st-century Swedish women politicians
Living people
Members of the Riksdag 1991–1994
Members of the Riksdag 1994–1998
Members of the Riksdag 1998–2002
Members of the Riksdag 2002–2006
Members of the Riksdag 2006–2010
Members of the Riksdag from the Christian Democrats (Sweden)
Women members of the Riksdag